Llanwenog is both a village and a community in Ceredigion, Wales. In 2011 the population of Llanwenog was 1,364, of whom 57.0% were able to speak Welsh. The community includes the villages of Alltyblacca, Gorsgoch, Cwmsychbant, Cwrtnewydd Highmead, Aber, Drefach and Rhuddlan.

The Llanwenog sheep is a breed of domestic sheep originating in Wales, which was developed in the 19th century.

Governance
An electoral ward with the same name stretches beyond the confines of Llanwenog Community and had a total population at the 2011 census of 1,854.

Notable people
 Evan James Williams (1903-1945), physicist, born in Cwmsychbant, attended Llanwenog Primary School.

References

Communities in Ceredigion